Anambra East is a Local Government Area in Anambra State, south-central Nigeria. Towns that make up the local government are Aguleri, Enugwu Aguleri, Eziagulu Otu Aguleri, Enugwu Otu Aguleri, Mkpunando-otu Aguleri, Ikem Ivite, Igbariam, Umuoba Anam, Nando, Umueri, Nsugbe.

In Anambra East, oil and gas was discovered in large quantity on the bank of Aguleri town and the president has commissioned exploration on the site and the operational head office of Orient Petroleum and Housing estate is about to be sited in Aguleri by the Orient Petroleum Resources.

Currently, Anambra East local government area recorded history with the successful landing and take-off of the Embraer ERJ 145 jet operated by Air Peace. Anambra State government signed a two billion dollars Memorandum of Understanding with Orient Petroleum Resources and Elite International Investment Limited for the building of an international airport city in Umueri, Anambra East Local Government Area.

Schools
Here is the list of secondary schools in Anambra East Local Government Area:
 Father Joseph Memorial High School, Aguleri 
 Col. Mike Attah Secondary School, Aguleri
 Justice Chinwuba Memorial Grammar School, Ivite, Aguleri
 Willie Obiano Secondary school, Enugwu Aguleri
 Fr Tansi memorial Secondary school, Aguleri
 Community Secondary School, Umuoba-Anam
 Government Technical College, Umueri
 Girls’ High School, Umuleri
 Community Secondary School, Ifite Umueri
 Community High School, Igbariam
 Community Secondary School, Nando
 Community High School, Nsugbe

Notable People in Anambra East Local Government Area 
Willie Obiano

Tony Nwoye

Emeka Idu

References

Local Government Areas in Anambra State
Local Government Areas in Igboland